Shruti Haasan is an Indian actress, composer and playback singer who works in Tamil, Telugu, Hindi, Kannada films. Haasan sang her first song aged just six in her father's Thevar Magan, a composition of Ilaiyaraaja. While in school, Haasan made her singing debut in the Hindi language film Chachi 420, which was directed by her father. Haasan sang the bilingual versions of the title theme "Rama Rama" with her father, in Hindi and in Tamil, for the film Hey Ram. The album from Ilaiyaraaja, which was critically praised, won Haasan accolades for her efforts with Screen India saying that she "has the makings of a good singer, and with some training she should go great guns."

Haasan sang along with veteran singer K. J. Yesudas for the film En Mana Vaanil (2002), under Ilaiyaraaja's music. She has sung for Gautham Vasudev Menon's Vaaranam Aayiram, under the composition of Harris Jayaraj. As of November 2008, Haasan is also midway through her untitled debut album, which she has composed, written and sung, and is set for release in mid-2009. A further song was recorded with her voice for her Hindi film Luck. In September 2010, Haasan collaborated with Dave Kushner for the film Hisss. Whilst Kushner composed the track, Haasan wrote the lyrics, sang and appeared in a promotional video for the film. She recently lent her voice for the Telugu film Aagadu, which was confirmed by director Srinu Vaitla via Twitter. After much speculation, Haasan was finalised as the music composer of the Tamil film Unnaipol Oruvan, which was released in 2009. The bilingual film was a remake of the Hindi film A Wednesday!. The soundtracks of both the projects are separate. Apart from this, Haasan is also the vocalist of an alternative rock band, The Extramentals. Haasan released her new song "Edge" with collaborated with her band in the UK. The Song crossed more than 1 Million Views in YouTube.

Soundtracks

See also 
 Shruti Haasan filmography

References 

Discographies of Indian artists